The 495th Fighter Squadron (495th FS), nicknamed the Valkyries, is part of the 48th Fighter Wing at RAF Lakenheath, United Kingdom. Having been reactivated on 1 October 2021, it became the first overseas United States Air Force squadron to operate the Lockheed Martin F-35A Lightning II on 15 December 2021.

The unit had previously operated the General Dynamics F-111F Aardvark at RAF Lakenheath between 1977 and 1991.

History

World War II
Activated as a Southeastern Air District Army Air Corps training squadron, equipped with a variety of second-line aircraft, both single and twin engine, preparing its pilots and maintenance crews for eventual combat. After the Pearl Harbor Attack, the squadron flew antisubmarine patrols from, March–April 1942. Resumed aircrew training, many of the group's members went on to serve in squadrons stationed in Europe and the Pacific theaters.

Eventually coming under the AAF III Fighter Command in 1944, trained replacement pilots with Republic P-47 Thunderbolts, inactivated in 1944 with the end of RTU training.

Cold War

The 495th was reactivated on 1 April 1977 as the 495th Tactical Fighter Squadron, becoming the fourth tactical fighter squadron with the 48th Tactical Fighter Wing at RAF Lakenheath, England. This was 33 years to the day since the squadron’s inactivation. The 495th mission was as a replacement training unit for General Dynamics F-111F Aardvark pilots and Weapon Systems Officers (WSO) assigned to the three combat fighter squadron at RAF Lakenheath.

The 495 TFS participated in Operation El Dorado Canyon on 15 April 1986, the air raid against Muammar Gaddafi's Libyan government due to its involvement in the West Berlin discotheque bombing ten days prior. The mission was successful, however one of the squadron's F-111Fs (70-2389), callsign 'Karma 52', was shot down over the Gulf of Sidra, killing pilot Capt. Fernando L. Ribas-Dominicci and WSO Capt. Paul F. Lorence.

In 1990, the 495 TFS deployed crews to augment the three deployed squadrons from the 48 TFW to Taif Air Base, Saudi Arabia, as part of Operation Desert Shield which was in response to the Iraqi invasion of Kuwait. The squadron suffered a loss on 15 October 1990, when F-111F 74-0183 crashed during a night time training mission, killing pilot Capt. Art Reid and WSO Capt. Thomas Caldwell.

The 495th was inactivated on 13 December 1991, shortly before retirement of the F-111F Aardvark at RAF Lakenheath.

Modern era
On 15 September 2020, the USAF announced that the 495th Fighter Squadron would be reactivated as first F-35A unit of the 48th Fighter Wing at RAF Lakenheath. On 6 April 2021, the unit was officially redesignated as the 495th Fighter Squadron.

The 495th FS was reactivated on 1 October 2021, with 27 aircraft and roughly 60 personnel. The "Valkyries" received their first four F-35As (19-5473, 19-5474, 19-5475, and 19-5476) on 15 December 2021. They received their next three F-35As (19-5484, 19-5485 and 19-5486) on 10 February 2022. The third batch, consisting of two aircraft, including the 493rd FS and 495th FS commanders’ jets (19-5493 and 19-5495) arrived on 15 April 2022. 19-5493 was integrated with the 495th FS until the 493rd FS reactivated with the F-35A Lightning II.

Lineage

 Constituted 9th Reconnaissance Squadron (Light) on 20 November 1940.
 Activated on 15 January 1941
 Redesignated: 88th Bombardment Squadron (Light) on 14 August 1941
 Redesignated: 88th Bombardment Squadron (Dive) on 28 August 1942
 Redesignated: 495th Fighter-Bomber Squadron on 10 August 1943
 Disbanded on 1 April 1944
 Reconstituted, redesignated: 495th Tactical Fighter Squadron and activated on 1 April 1977 (not operational until 29 July 1977)
 Inactivated on 13 December 1991
 Redesignated: 495th Fighter Squadron on 6 April 2021
 Activated on 1 October 2021

Assignments
 48th Bombardment (later Fighter-Bomber) Group
 Attached on 15 January 1941
 Assigned on 14 August 1941
 407th Fighter-Bomber Group, March 1944 – 1 April 1944
 48th Tactical Fighter Wing, 1 April 1977 – 13 December 1991
 48th Operations Group, 1 October 2021 – present

Stations
 Savannah Army Air Base, Georgia, 15 January 1941
 Will Rogers Field, Oklahoma 26 May 1941
 Savannah Army Air Base, Georgia. 7 February 1942
 Key Field, Mississippi, 28 June 1942
 William Northern Field, Tennessee, 20 August 1943
 Galveston Army Airfield, Texas, March 1944 – 1 April 1944
 RAF Lakenheath, Suffolk, England, 1 April 1977 – 13 December 1991; 1 October 2021 – present

Aircraft

 Douglas B-18 Bolo (1941)
 Douglas A-20 Havoc (1941–1943)
 Bell P-39 Airacobra (1942–1944)
 Curtiss P-40 Warhawk (1942–1944)
 Vultee A-35 Vengeance (1943)

 Douglas A-24 Banshee (1943)
 Republic P-47 Thunderbolt (1944)
 General Dynamics F-111F Aardvark (1977–1991)
 Lockheed Martin F-35A Lightning II (2021–present)

References

Notes

Bibliography

 
 

Fighter squadrons of the United States Air Force